The 2011 Dublin Horse Show was that year's edition of the Dublin Horse Show, the Irish official show jumping competition at Dublin. It was held as CSIO 5*. The main sponsor was Discover Ireland.

The first horse show was held in 1864 in Dublin by the Royal Agricultural Society of Ireland. Since 1868 it is held by the Royal Dublin Society. In 1926 International Competitions were introduced to this horse show for the first time, it was also the first year the Aga Khan Trophy was held.

The 2011 edition of the Discover Ireland Dublin Horse Show was held between 3 August 2011 and 7 August 2011.

FEI Nations Cup of Ireland 
The 2011 FEI Nations Cup of Ireland was part of the 2011 Dublin Horse Show. It was the seventh competition of the 2011 Meydan FEI Nations Cup of Ireland.
The Nations Cup of Ireland was held on Friday, 5 August 2011 at 2:55 pm. The competing teams will be: France, Great Britain, the Netherlands, Ireland, Belgium, Denmark, Germany and the United States of America.

The competition was a show jumping competition with two rounds and optionally one jump-off. The fences were up to 1.60 metres high. The competition is endowed with €200,000.

(grey penalty points do not count for the team result)

Land Rover Puissance 
The Puissance at 2011 Dublin Horse Show was the main show jumping competition on Saturday, 6 August 2011 at the 2011 Dublin Horse Show. It was held at 6:05 pm.

The competition was held as Puissance competition with one round and up to four jump-offs. It was endowed with £36,000, the sponsor of this competition is Land Rover.

(Top 7 of 14 Competitors)

The Longines International Grand Prix of Ireland 
The International Grand Prix of Ireland, the Show jumping Grand Prix of the 2011 Dublin Horse Show, was the major show jumping competition at this event. The sponsor of this competition is Longines. It was held on Sunday, 7 August 2011 at 3:00 pm. The competition was a show jumping competition with two rounds, the fences were up to 1.60 meters high.

It was endowed with 200,000 €.

(Top 5 of 40 Competitors)

References

External links 
 
 2011 results

Dublin Horse Show
Dublin Horse Show
Dublin Horse Show
Dublin Horse Show
Dublin Horse Show, 2011
Dublin Horse Show
Dublin Horse Show